The 1939 International University Games were organised by the Confederation Internationale des Etudiants (CIE) and held in Monte Carlo, Monaco. At these games a number of Athletic events were contested. An alternative version was held in Vienna, Austria.

Athletics medal summar

Men

Women

Medal table

Participating nations

References
World Student Games (Pre-Universiade) - GBR Athletics 

Athletics at the Summer Universiade
Uni
International sports competitions hosted by Monaco
1939 in Monaco
Summer World University Games